Daniel John Cannon (born 5 October 1968) is a British film and television producer, director and writer, known for executive producing the 15-season show CSI: Crime Scene Investigation series franchise (and directed multiple episodes including the series pilot), and simultaneously executive producing the CSI: Miami and CSI: NY spinoffs.

From 2014 to 2019, for the show's duration, Cannon executive produced, wrote and directed FOX's Gotham, which won the 2014 Critics Choice Award for Most Exciting New Series and received 11 Emmy nominations (one win). In July 2019, his newest television production, Pennyworth, which Cannon co-created and executive produced with Bruno Heller, premiered on Epix, concluding in November 2022 on HBO Max.

As a TV entertainment figure and a rare TV pilot director who also works as a key writer, Cannon has directed 15 television pilots, 12 of which have been ordered to series, including: Training Day (2017), Gotham (2014), The Tomorrow People (2013), Nikita (2010), Dark Blue (2009), The Forgotten (2009), and Eleventh Hour (2008). At one time, Cannon had five television series on-air, while acting as executive producer.

Feature film directorial credits include Geostorm (2017), I Still Know What You Did Last Summer (1998), Judge Dredd (1995), and The Young Americans (1993).

Career

Early career
Cannon began making films at the age of 16 in 1984, and started a youth experimental theatre group at 33 Arts Centre making video dramas with a number of other directors in different roles, including cameraman. A major influence was the centre's video maker, Dermot Byrne, with whom Cannon worked on a number of projects. Aged 23, he met musician David Arnold who played in a band that rehearsed there. Cannon convinced Arnold to compose soundtracks for his and other people's videos. Arnold's first professional score was for Cannon's debut feature 'The Young Americans'.

In 1987, he won the BBC Young Filmmaker of the Year Award, by Alan Parker, with a 40-minute short called Sometimes. 1988-1990 he attended the National Film and Television School. His intermediate film, 'Play Dead' was screened on Channel 4 while his graduation film Strangers (1990) appeared at the Edinburgh International Film Festival.

1990s
Cannon worked on commercials for James Garrett and later RSA, and made his debut feature The Young Americans in (1993).  His second film, the big-budget Sylvester Stallone feature Judge Dredd was not well received critically in 1995. In 1998 he directed two features, the teen slasher film I Still Know What You Did Last Summer and he directed Ray Liotta, Anjelica Huston and Jeremy Piven in Phoenix.

2000s

Cannon's immersion into primetime television began when he was hired by Jerry Bruckheimer to produce and direct the pilot episode of CSI: Crime Scene Investigation in 2000. Cannon is credited with creating the look and visual style of the CSI, which ran for 15 seasons, earning a total of 39 Emmy nominations and spawning three spinoff shows. He went on to write and direct many episodes of the flagship series, while overseeing the production as executive producer. Simultaneously, he also executive produced both CSI: Miami, which premiered in 2002 (and directed the pilot of), and CSI: NY (2004).

Stemming from his personal passion and experience with the sport of football, in 2005, Cannon directed the film Goal!.

In 2006, he returned to television with the CBS television pilot, Capital Law, about a group of legal associates trying to make partner at a powerful Washington, D.C.–based law firm.

In 2007, Cannon co-created TNT's crime drama series starring Dylan McDermott called Dark Blue and directed the pilot episode. The following year he produced and directed 'The Eleventh Hour' for CBS, which ran for one season.

In 2010, Cannon joined The CW action series Nikita, as director and executive producer. It successfully ran for four seasons on the network.

In 2011, he executive produced and directed the pilot FOX crime/mystery series Alcatraz along with J. J. Abrams for WBTV.

In 2016, Cannon was brought on to direct reshoots for the feature film Geostorm, in an attempt to help save the studios over budget production.

In 2017, Cannon replaced feature film director Antoine Fuqua for a TV version of Fuqua's film Training Day, starring Bill Paxton, based on the 2001 Denzel Washington feature film. He stayed on as the show's executive producer.

From 2014 to 2018, Cannon executive produced the television series Gotham, for which he directed the pilot of, along with writing and directing several episodes during the series' five-year run. Under Cannon's creative guidance, the show has been nominated for 11 Primetime Emmy Awards, and in 2017 won its first Emmy for Outstanding Special and Visual Effects in a Supporting Role.<ref name="‘Westworld,’ ‘Gotham’ Recognized for Outstanding VFX at 69th Creative Arts Emmy Awards"

In 2018, it was announced that Gotham would produce its fifth and final season, which premiered in 2019.

Partnering with his Gotham writer-producer partner Bruno Heller, Cannon is currently producing Pennyworth, a Batman-esque prequel set in 1960s London, which documents the early years of Batman's butler Alfred Pennyworth. Cannon executive produces and writes along with Heller, and has directed multiple episodes, including the series premiere, which have aired on Epix.

Filmography

Television

Film

Awards and nominations

Personal life 
Cannon has two daughters. He plays football regularly with Hollywood United F.C., a local Los Angeles club team consisting of mostly celebrities and former professional footballers, who play socially against other local teams for friendly matches and charity events.

References

External links 

English television directors
English television producers
English television writers
English film producers
English film directors
Hollywood United players
People from Luton
1968 births
Living people
British male television writers
Primetime Emmy Award winners
Science fiction film directors
Action film directors
Association footballers not categorized by position
Association football players not categorized by nationality